The Lancashire Fusiliers Football Club was a team of the 1st Battalion, The Lancashire Fusiliers, that was a member of the Irish Football League for the 1891–92 season, while deployed in Victoria Barracks, Belfast.

References

Defunct association football clubs in Northern Ireland
Defunct Irish Football League clubs
Association football clubs in Belfast
Former senior Irish Football League clubs
Association football in the British Army
Military football clubs in Northern Ireland
Lancashire Fusiliers